Brigitte Kiesler (15 August 1924 – 10 May 2013) was a German gymnast. She competed in seven events at the 1952 Summer Olympics.

References

External links
 

1924 births
2013 deaths
German female artistic gymnasts
Olympic gymnasts of Germany
Gymnasts at the 1952 Summer Olympics
People from Ludwigslust
Sportspeople from Mecklenburg-Western Pomerania